Thomas Raynesford Lounsbury (January 1, 1838 – April 9, 1915) was an American literary historian and critic, born in Ovid, New York, January 1, 1838. He graduated from Yale College in 1859 and subsequently received honorary degrees from Yale, Harvard, Lafayette, Princeton, and Aberdeen. He enlisted in the 126th New York Volunteers in 1862 and served in the Civil War as a first lieutenant.

From 1871 until his retirement in 1906 he was professor of English language and literature in Yale. For 33 years he was also librarian at Sheffield Scientific School, Yale. He was elected a member of the American Academy of Arts and Letters (1898) and the American Academy of Arts and Sciences (1896).

His work is marked by sound scholarship  and literary acumen. It is as a student of Chaucer, of Shakespeare, and of the English language from the point of view of its development that he especially distinguished himself. His editorial work includes: Chaucer's Parliament of Foules (1877); the Complete Works of Charles Dudley Warner (1904); and the Yale Book of American Verse (1912). Professor Lounsbury wrote other important publications which include:  

 A History of the English Language (1879, 1894)  
 Life of James Fenimore Cooper (1882)  
 Studies in Chaucer (three volumes, 1891) 
 Shakespeare as a Dramatic Artist (1901)  
 Shakespeare and Voltaire (1902)  
 The Standard of Pronunciation in English (1904)  
 The Text of Shakespeare (1906)  
 The Standard of Usage in English (1908)  
 English Spelling and Spelling Reform (1909)  
 Shakespeare as a Dramatic Artist (1912)

Lounsbury was also the subject of some needling by Mark Twain, in his famous critique of James Fenimore Cooper ("Fenimore Cooper's Literary Offenses", written 1895). Lounsbury had written favorably of Cooper, which Twain took to mean that Lounsbury simply hadn't actually read Cooper.

References

External links
 
 
 
Thomas Raynesford Lounsbury Papers (MS 1231). Manuscripts and Archives, Yale University Library.

1838 births
1915 deaths
Yale University faculty
American bibliographers
Chaucer scholars
Shakespearean scholars
Yale College alumni
19th-century American historians
19th-century American male writers
People from Ovid, New York
Union Army officers
Fellows of the American Academy of Arts and Sciences
Members of the American Academy of Arts and Letters
American male non-fiction writers
Historians from New York (state)